The Flood Inside is the fourth studio album by German post-rock/post-metal/progressive rock band Long Distance Calling. It was released on 4 March 2013, through Superball Music and reached No. 33 in the German charts. It is the first album to have a set vocalist (Martin "Marsen" Fischer) and features vocals on four of the eight tracks. The song "Welcome Change" features guest vocals from Norway singer/songwriter Petter Carlsen and Anathema's frontman Vincent Cavanagh.

Track listing

Personnel 
 David Jordan – guitar
 Janosch Rathmer – drums
 Florian Füntmann – guitar
 Jan Hoffmann – bass
 Martin Fischer - vocals and sounds

Reception 
The change to include a vocalist and the album in general were very well received, with positive reviews from EMP, Metal Hammer, and Metal Revolution among others, Metal Hammer referring to the new vocalist as "vocally capable of adding an extra dimension, musically".

References 

2013 albums
Long Distance Calling (band) albums
Superball Music albums